Balatonlelle Sportegyesület is a professional football club based in Balatonlelle, Somogy County, Hungary, that competes in the Somogy county league.

Name changes
1924–?: Balatonlelle
?-1948: Balatonlellei Barátság
1948–?: Balatonlelle
1950–1974: Balatonlellei Vörös Meteor
1974–1975: Balatonlellei Községi Sportkör
1975–1979: Balatonlellei Spartacus
1979: merger with Balatonboglár 
1979–1992: Boglárlelle SE
1992–present: Balatonlelle Sportegyesület

Honours
Somogy megyei I. 
winner: 1984–85, 1993–94, 2009–10,2018-19
Szabad Föld kupa:
Runner-up: 1988
Nemzeti Bajnokság III:
Winner: 2000–01
Errea Kupa győztes
Winner: 2009/2010
Dél-Dunántúli Regionális Kupa 
Winner: 2009–10

External links
 Profile on Magyar Futball

References

Football clubs in Hungary
Association football clubs established in 1924
1924 establishments in Hungary